The canton of La Ferté-sous-Jouarre is a French administrative division, located in the arrondissement of Meaux, in the Seine-et-Marne département (Île-de-France région).

Demographics

Composition 
At the French canton reorganisation which came into effect in March 2015, the canton was expanded from 19 to 47 communes:

Armentières-en-Brie
Bassevelle
Bussières
Chamigny
Changis-sur-Marne
Citry
Cocherel
Congis-sur-Thérouanne
Coulombs-en-Valois
Crouy-sur-Ourcq
Dhuisy
Douy-la-Ramée
Étrépilly
La Ferté-sous-Jouarre
Fublaines
Germigny-l'Évêque
Germigny-sous-Coulombs
Isles-les-Meldeuses
Jaignes
Jouarre
Lizy-sur-Ourcq
Luzancy
Marcilly
Mary-sur-Marne
May-en-Multien
Méry-sur-Marne
Montceaux-lès-Meaux
Nanteuil-lès-Meaux
Nanteuil-sur-Marne
Ocquerre
Pierre-Levée
Le Plessis-Placy
Poincy
Puisieux
Reuil-en-Brie
Saâcy-sur-Marne
Sainte-Aulde
Saint-Jean-les-Deux-Jumeaux
Sammeron
Sept-Sorts
Signy-Signets
Tancrou
Trilport
Trocy-en-Multien
Ussy-sur-Marne  
Vendrest
Vincy-Manœuvre

See also
Cantons of the Seine-et-Marne department
Communes of the Seine-et-Marne department

References

Ferte sous jouarre, La